Herbert J. Biberman (March 4, 1900 – June 30, 1971) was an American screenwriter and film director. He was one of the Hollywood Ten and directed Salt of the Earth (1954), a film barely released in the United States, about a zinc miners' strike in Grant County, New Mexico. His membership in the Directors Guild of America was posthumously restored in 1997; he had been expelled in 1950.

Biberman was born in Philadelphia, Pennsylvania, to Joseph and Eva Biberman and was the brother of American artist, Edward Biberman. Biberman's pre-blacklist career included writing such films as King of Chinatown (1939), When Tomorrow Comes (1939), Action in Arabia (1944), The Master Race (1944), which he also directed, and New Orleans (1947), as well as directing such films as One Way Ticket (1935) and Meet Nero Wolfe (1936). He married actress Gale Sondergaard in 1930; the marriage lasted for the rest of Biberman's life. Biberman died from bone cancer in 1971 in New York City.

HUAC

Though he would become firmly pro-war after Germany invaded the Soviet Union, during the Molotov-Ribbentrop pact, his outspoken opposition to U.S. Lend-Lease to the United Kingdom was so intense, the FBI suspected Biberman (who was actually Jewish) of being a Nazi. In 1947, the Congressional House Committee on Un-American Activities began its investigation into the film industry, and Biberman became one of ten Hollywood writers and directors cited for contempt of Congress when they refused to answer questions about their American Communist Party affiliation. Evidence presented in the hearing showed that Biberman had been a member of the communist party since at least 1944. Biberman and the others were imprisoned for their contempt convictions, Biberman for six months. Edward Dmytryk ultimately cooperated with the House committee, but Biberman and the others were blacklisted by the Hollywood studios.

Biberman worked independently after his release from jail. The result was Salt of the Earth (1954), a fictionalized account of the Grant County miners' strike. The screenplay was by Michael Wilson and it was produced by Paul Jarrico, neither members of the Ten but they were both also blacklisted. Salt of the Earth has been deemed "culturally significant" by the United States Library of Congress and selected for preservation in the National Film Registry.

Legacy
One of the Hollywood Ten, a 2000 film chronicling his blacklisting and the making of Salt of the Earth from Biberman's point of view, starred Jeff Goldblum as Biberman and Greta Scacchi as his wife, the actress Gale Sondergaard. The film's closing credits noted Biberman had never been removed from the old blacklist formally, and that Sondergaard had not found work in Hollywood until shortly before her husband's death. Biberman's membership in the Directors Guild of America, which was stripped in 1950, was restored in 1997.

Filmography

References

Further reading
 Caballero, Raymond. McCarthyism vs. Clinton Jencks. Norman: University of Oklahoma Press, 2019.

External links
 
 
 
 Review in TV Guide of biopic, "One of the Hollywood Ten."

American film directors
American male screenwriters
Hollywood blacklist
Jewish American screenwriters
Writers from Philadelphia
Deaths from bone cancer
1900 births
1971 deaths
Deaths from cancer in New York (state)
Screenwriters from Pennsylvania
20th-century American male writers
20th-century American screenwriters
20th-century American Jews